Richard Albertus "Babe" Tysseling (December 26, 1910 – September 3, 1997) was an American football, basketball, and baseball player, coach, and college athletics administrator. He served as the head football coach at Central College in Pella, Iowa from 1938 to 1944 and from 1946 to 1960, compiling a record of 85–89–7.

Tysseling attended Central College, where lettered four times each in football, basketball, baseball, and track. He played as an end and quarterback in football, a guard in basketball and a second baseman in baseball. In track he competed as a sprinter and pole vaulter. After graduating from Central in 1932, Tysseling coached high school for give years in Garden Grove, Iowa. In 1937, he was hired as an assistant coach in football and basketball at Shenandoah High School in Shenandoah, Iowa.

Tysseling died in September 3, 1997, at Pella Community Hospital, following a long illness.

Head coaching record

Football

References

External links
 

1910 births
1997 deaths
American men's basketball players
American football ends
American football quarterbacks
American male pole vaulters
American male sprinters
Baseball second basemen
Guards (basketball)
Central Dutch athletic directors
Central Dutch baseball coaches
Central Dutch baseball players
Central Dutch football coaches
Central Dutch football players
Central Dutch men's basketball coaches
Central Dutch men's basketball players
College men's track and field athletes in the United States
High school basketball coaches in Iowa
High school football coaches in Iowa
People from Pella, Iowa
Coaches of American football from Iowa
Players of American football from Iowa
Baseball coaches from Iowa
Baseball players from Iowa
Basketball coaches from Iowa
Basketball players from Iowa
Track and field athletes from Iowa